Shortland Street is a New Zealand soap opera that has been broadcast on TV2 since May 25, 1992. The show centers on the title hospital and its staff and their families. The following characters currently appear in the soap opera. Characters whom have been portrayed by more than one actor, are listed, with the most recent actor at the top of the list.

Main characters

Recurring characters

Lists of characters by year of introduction 

 1992
 1993
 1994
 1995
 1996
 1997
 1998
 1999
 2000
 2001
 2002
 2003
 2004
 2005
 2006
 2007
 2008
 2009
 2010
 2011
 2012
 2013
 2014
 2015
 2016
 2017
 2018
 2019
 2020
 2021
 2022
 2023

References

Shortland Street characters
Fictional physicians
Fictional surgeons